Best Of En Vogue is the first greatest hits compilation album by the American R&B/pop group En Vogue. It was released in 1999 on East West Records. The album comprises nearly all of their hit singles released between the years of 1990 and 1998.

The compilation features hit songs from their albums; Born to Sing (1990), Funky Divas (1992), and EV3 (1997). It also included "No Fool, No More" recorded for the film soundtrack Why Do Fools Fall in Love.

Other tracks included on album include their biggest hits "Don't Let Go (Love)", "Whatta Man", "My Lovin' (You're Never Gonna Get It), "Free Your Mind", "Runaway Love", and remixes of "Let It Flow" and first hit single, "Hold On".

Track listing
All tracks written by Thomas McElroy and Denzil Foster, except noted otherwise.

Personnel
Producer – Denzil Foster, Thomas McElroy
Producer – Babyface
Producer – David Foster
Executive producer – Denzil Foster, Thomas McElroy

Charts

References

1999 greatest hits albums
En Vogue compilation albums